This World Science Fiction Convention (Worldcon) list includes prior and scheduled Worldcons.  The data is maintained by the Long List Committee, a World Science Fiction Society sub-committee.

Notes:
 Name – a convention is normally listed by the least confusing version of its name. This is usually the name preferred by the convention, but fannish tradition is followed in retroactively numbering the first Worldcon in a series 1 (or I or One).
 Guests of honor – custom in designating guests of honor has varied greatly, with some conventions giving specific titles (Fan, Pro, Australia, US, Artist, etc.) and some simply call them all guests of honor. Specific labels have been used where they existed, as have regional variants in spelling.
 Size – where available, this column records two numbers: how many paying members attended the Worldcon and how many total members there were (in parentheses). The available data is very incomplete and imprecise and many of these numbers are probably substantially in error.
 No Worldcons were held between 1942 and 1945 due to World War II.

External links
 Official Worldcon long list

References